The following Confederate States Army units and commanders fought in the Battle of Cold Harbor (May 31–June 12, 1864) of the American Civil War. The Union order of battle is listed separately. Order of battle compiled from the army organization during the battle and the reports.

Abbreviations used

Military rank
 Gen = General
 LTG = Lieutenant General
 MG = Major General
 BG = Brigadier General
 Col = Colonel
 Ltc = Lieutenant Colonel
 Maj = Major
 Cpt = Captain
 Lt = Lieutenant

Other
 (w) = wounded
 (mw) = mortally wounded
 (k) = killed
 (c) = captured

Army of Northern Virginia

Gen Robert E. Lee, Commanding

General Staff:
 Chief Engineer: MG Martin L. Smith
 Chief of Artillery: BG William N. Pendleton
 Assistant Adjutant General: Ltc Walter H. Taylor
 Aide de Camp: Ltc Charles Marshall
 Aide de Camp: Maj Charles S. Venable

First Corps

MG Richard H. Anderson

Second Corps

MG Jubal A. Early

Third Corps

LTG Ambrose P. Hill

Cavalry Corps

MG Wade Hampton

Breckinridge's Division

Hoke's Division

See also
 Wilderness Confederate order of battle
 Spotsylvania Court House Confederate order of battle

Notes

References
 Eicher, John H., and David J. Eicher. Civil War High Commands. Stanford, CA: Stanford University Press, 2001. .
 Rhea, Gordon C. Cold Harbor: Grant and Lee May 26-June 3, 1864. Baton Rouge: Louisiana State University Press, 2002. 
 Sibley, Jr., F. Ray, The Confederate Order of Battle, Volume 1, The Army of Northern Virginia, Shippensburg, Pennsylvania, 1996. 
 U.S. War Department, The War of the Rebellion: a Compilation of the Official Records of the Union and Confederate Armies, U.S. Government Printing Office, 1880–1901.
 Wise, Jennings C., The Long Arm of Lee, Volumen 2: Chancellorsville to Appomattox, University of Nebraska Press, Lincoln and London, 1991 
 Wittenberg, Eric J. Glory Enough For All: Sheridan's Second Raid and the Battle of Trevilian Station. Washington, DC: Brassey's, Inc, 2001. 

American Civil War orders of battle